Pablo Carreño Busta (born 12 July 1991) is a Spanish professional tennis player. He has been ranked as high as world No. 10 by the Association of Tennis Professionals (ATP), which he first achieved on 11 September 2017. He also reached a best doubles ranking of No. 16, on 17 July 2017. He has won seven singles titles, including a Masters 1000 title at the Canadian Open, and four doubles titles on the ATP Tour. Representing Spain, Carreño Busta has won an Olympic bronze medal in men's singles at the 2020 Tokyo Olympics (defeating world No. 1 Novak Djokovic en route) and was a member of the Spanish team that won the 2019 Davis Cup.

Career

Juniors
Carreño Busta reached as high as No. 6 in the combined junior world rankings in February 2009.

2009–13: Early pro tour, Grand Slam debut
His first appearance in an ATP Tour tournament was at the 2011 Barcelona Open, where he lost in the first round to Benoît Paire.

He has reached 18 singles finals competing in ITF Futures tournaments; and won eleven of these: one in 2009, one in 2010, three in 2011, and six in 2013. He also won two challenger titles from two finals in 2011, and at this point reached a career high singles ranking of no. 133. He missed the majority of the 2012 season due to injury, and underwent surgery on his back later that year. Carreño returned towards the latter stages of 2012, after five months of recovery, and played in four Futures tournaments to end the year, all in Morocco, although he did not progress past the semi-final stage in any. He ended the year with a singles ranking of No. 715.

After a strong start to the opening three months of 2013, winning 42 out of 43 matches on the ITF Circuit, Carreño Busta entered the qualification stage of the 2013 Grand Prix Hassan II in April, held in Casablanca, Morocco. He won his three qualifying matches, and then beat first seed and two-time Grand Prix Hassan II champion, Pablo Andújar, 6–4, 2–6, 6–3. He lost in the following round to eventual runner-up, Kevin Anderson. Later on that month, Carreño Busta reached the semi-final stage of the 2013 Portugal Open, again progressing through the qualification rounds, before losing to Stan Wawrinka in three sets.

Carreño Busta participated in his first ever grand slam tournament when he was a qualifier at the 2013 French Open. He won his three qualification matches, before losing to Roger Federer in straight sets in the opening round.

2016: Breakthrough, first ATP title, US Open doubles final, top 40
In April, Carreño Busta reached his second ATP final at ATP Estoril after defeating Benoît Paire. He was defeated in the finals by compatriot Nicolás Almagro. In August, he won his first ever ATP singles title at the 2016 Winston-Salem Open, defeating compatriot Roberto Bautista Agut in the final. He entered the top 40 of the ATP rankings for the first time as a result, becoming world No. 39.

2017: Strong Grand Slam results, Top Ten & ATP Finals debut
After a quarterfinal appearance in Sydney, Carreño Busta reached the third round of the Australian Open losing to Denis Istomin. He also made the semifinals of the doubles alongside Guillermo García López. In Buenos Aires, he lost to the eventual champion Alexandr Dolgopolov in straight sets in the semifinals. The following week, Carreño Busta reached his first ATP 500 final at the Rio Open, saving a match point against rising teen Casper Ruud en route before losing to Dominic Thiem. However, he won the doubles title with Pablo Cuevas. In São Paulo, he fell to Cuevas, his doubles partner, the two-time defending and eventual champion in the semifinals.

At the Indian Wells Open in March, Carreño Busta avenged his defeat to Cuevas, saving two match points in the process to advance to his first ATP Masters 1000 semifinal where he lost to world No. 3, Stan Wawrinka, in straight sets. As a result, he rose to a new career high of world No. 19. He received a first round bye at the Miami Open but was upset by Federico Delbonis in the second. In Spain's quarterfinal Davis Cup tie against Serbia, he lost both of his matches to Viktor Troicki in singles and to Troicki and Nenad Zimonjić in doubles.

Carreño Busta began his clay-court season at the Monte-Carlo Masters, where he lost to world No. 2 Novak Djokovic, in three sets in the third round. He reached the same round in Barcelona, losing to lucky loser Yuichi Sugita who had defeated Tommy Robredo and Richard Gasquet in the first two rounds. After early losses in Madrid and Rome, Carreño Busta played his maiden Grand Slam quarterfinal at the French Open, upsetting eleventh seed Grigor Dimitrov in straight sets and fifth seed Milos Raonic in five sets en route. In his quarterfinal against compatriot Rafael Nadal, Carreño Busta was forced to retire at a set and 0–2 down due to injury.

At the US Open he made his first Grand Slam semifinal without dropping a set, beating Diego Schwartzman at the quarterfinal stage. He then lost to Kevin Anderson in four sets. At the year-end ATP Finals, he served as an Alternate in replacement of Rafael Nadal, who withdrew from playing his first round. Carreño Busta then went on lose to Dominic Thiem and to eventual champion Grigor Dimitrov. His year end ranking was No. 10.

2018: First Masters doubles final & second singles semifinal, Top-10 wins

At the Australian Open, Carreño Busta defeated Jason Kubler, Gilles Simon, and Gilles Müller to advance to the fourth round, where he lost in a close four set match to eventual finalist Marin Čilić.

At the Miami Masters, Carreño Busta was seeded 16th. He defeated Denis Istomin, Steve Johnson, 31st seed Fernando Verdasco, and sixth seed Kevin Anderson, before losing to fourth seed Alexander Zverev in the semifinals.

Carreño Busta reached the semifinals of a second consecutive event at the Barcelona Open. He defeated Benoît Paire, Adrian Mannarino, and upset second seed Grigor Dimitrov before losing to unseeded Stefanos Tsitsipas in the semifinals. He then reached the semifinals of a third consecutive tournament at the Estoril Open before losing to Frances Tiafoe. After suffering an opening round loss at the Madrid Masters to Borna Ćorić, he followed up with a quarterfinal appearance at the Rome Masters, losing to Marin Čilić. At the same tournament he reached his first Masters final in doubles partnering João Sousa. In the third round of the French Open, he was defeated by Marco Cecchinato.

At Wimbledon, Carreño Busta was upset in the first round by unseeded Moldovan Radu Albot.

At the Cincinnati Masters, Carreño Busta made the quarterfinals where he was defeated again by Marin Čilić. He then reached the semifinals of the Winston-Salem Open, defeating 16th seed Peter Gojowczyk and sixth seed Chung Hyeon before losing to eighth seed Steve Johnson. At the US Open, Carreño Busta was upset by João Sousa in the second round. He suffered opening-round losses at both the Shanghai and Paris Masters.

2019: Fourth ATP title and Davis Cup champion

Carreño Busta opened his 2019 season at the Auckland Open, facing David Ferrer, who retired just two games into the match. He was then defeated in a close three set match against Jan-Lennard Struff.

At the Australian Open, Carreño Busta was seeded 23rd. He defeated Luca Vanni, Ilya Ivashka, and 12th seed Fabio Fognini to reach the fourth round, where he faced Kei Nishikori. Carreño Busta narrowly won the first two sets before losing a close third set tiebreak. Nishikori took the fourth, and the fifth eventually proceeded to a tiebreaker. Carreño Busta led the tiebreak until 8–5, when a late call from a linesperson sparked an argument between Carreño Busta and the umpire. Ultimately, Nishikori was awarded the point, and went on to win the next four points, winning the tiebreak 10–8. The match had lasted over five hours. After the match, Carreño Busta refused to shake the umpire's hand, and threw his bag onto the court before leaving the stadium amidst a booing crowd. In a post-match conference, he apologized for his outburst.

After missing much of the rest of the season due to injury, Carreño Busta won his fourth ATP title at the Chengdu Open beating Denis Shapovalov in the semifinal and Alexander Bublik in the final. He was also part of the Spain team that won the 2019 Davis Cup.

2020: Inaugural ATP Cup finalist, second US Open semis, French Open quarters
Carreño Busta's first major of the year was the Australian Open, where he lost his third round match to top-seeded Rafael Nadal. Then much of the 2020 season was interrupted by the COVID-19 pandemic.

Carreño Busta's season resumed at the 2020 US Open, where he defeated Yasutaka Uchiyama in five sets in the first round, then Mitchell Krueger and Ricardas Berankis in straight sets. In the fourth round, he faced world No. 1 Novak Djokovic, who was unbeaten in 2020 before then. Carreño Busta was up a break, 6–5 in the first set, when Djokovic unintentionally hit a lineswoman in the throat with a ball. This defaulted Djokovic from the tournament, advancing Carreño Busta to the quarterfinals, where he defeated 12th seed Denis Shapovalov in five sets. He then lost to fifth seed Alexander Zverev in five sets in the semifinals despite being two sets up.

At the French Open, Carreño Busta was seeded 17th and reached the quarterfinals after victories against 10th seed Roberto Bautista Agut and Daniel Altmaier. In a rematch of the US Open, he faced Djokovic, to whom he lost in four sets.

2021: 200th career win, two ATP titles, Olympic bronze medalist
Carreño Busta won the first edition of the Andalucía Open in Marbella, Spain as the top seed by defeating Jaume Munar 6–1, 2–6, 6–4 in an all Spanish final. The victory was also his 200th match win on the ATP Tour.

Carreño Busta won the biggest title of his career, and sixth title overall at Hamburg, when he defeated Filip Krajinović in straight sets in the final to win the title.

At the Olympics, Carreño Busta beat Tennys Sandgren, Marin Čilić, Dominik Koepfer and world No. 2 Daniil Medvedev to reach the semifinals. There, he lost to 12th seed Karen Khachanov in straight sets, but bounced back to defeat world No. 1 Novak Djokovic in three sets to claim the bronze medal.

At the US Open, Carreño Busta was upset in the first round by American qualifier Maxime Cressy, losing a two sets to love lead for the second consecutive year at the US Open and failing to convert four match points in the fifth set tiebreak.

2022: ATP Cup and home finalist, Maiden Masters title 
Carreño Busta began his 2022 season representing Spain at the ATP Cup. He went undefeated in singles in the group stage, recording victories over Alejandro Tabilo of Chile, Viktor Durasovic of Norway, and Filip Krajinović of Serbia, as Spain advanced to the semifinals. In the semifinals against Poland, Carreño Busta defeated Jan Zieliński to help Spain advance to the finals.

At the Barcelona Open, he defeated second seed Casper Ruud in the quarterfinals after saving three match points, following another three setter win in the round of 16 against Lorenzo Sonego in the same day. Then, Carreño Busta beat Diego Schwartzman in straight sets, after the match was suspended early in the first set and moved to the next day for his first all Spanish final in Barcelona against Carlos Alcaraz. He lost in the final in straight sets against Alcaraz.
He lost in the first round in the French Open and at Wimbledon to Gilles Simon in five sets and to Dusan Lajovic via retirement, respectively.
At the Swedish Open in Bastad, he reached the semifinals defeating Diego Schwartzman in straight sets conceding only one game in the entire match. He fell to the eventual champion Francisco Cerundolo.

At the Canadian Open, he reached the quarterfinals at this Masters for the first time, defeating 11th seed Matteo Berrettini, Holger Rune and seventh seed Jannik Sinner. Next he reached his third semifinal at a Masters level defeating Jack Draper. In the semifinals, he defeated Briton Dan Evans to advance to his first career Masters 1000 final. He played eighth seed Hubert Hurkacz in the final and won the title to become the first unseeded player to win this event in 20 years since Guillermo Cañas in 2002 and the first player ranked outside the Top 20 since a No. 43-ranked Andrei Pavel the year before in 2001.

At the US Open, Carreño Busta reached the fourth round after defeating Dominic Thiem, Alexander Bublik, and Alex de Minaur. In the fourth round, he lost to Karen Khachanov in a five set match lasting more than 3 hours. He also reached the round of 16 at the 2022 Rolex Paris Masters where he lost to Tommy Paul (tennis).

2023
Carreño Busta started his 2023 season at the Adelaide International 2. Seeded second, he lost in the second round to lucky loser and eventual champion, Kwon Soon-woo. Seeded 14th at the Australian Open, he lost in a second round five-set thriller to Benjamin Bonzi.

In February, Carreño Busta competed at the Rotterdam Open. Seeded seventh, he was eliminated in the first round by Richard Gasquet in three sets.

Personal life
Carreño Busta was born in Gijón to parents Alfonso Carreño Morrondo and María Antonia Busta Vallina and has two sisters, Lucía and Alicia. He currently resides in Barcelona and trains at the JC Ferrero Equelite Sport Academy in Alicante. He married tax advisor Claudia Díaz Borrego in December 2021.

Career statistics

Grand Slam performance timelines 

Current through the 2023 Australian Open.

Singles

Doubles

Grand Slam tournament finals

Men's Doubles: 1 (1 runner-up)

Olympic medal finals

Singles: 1 (1 Bronze Medal)

Masters 1000 finals

Singles: 1 (1 title)

Doubles: 2 (1 title, 1 runner-up)

Notes

References

External links

Pablo Carreño Busta on TeniSpain.com

 

Sportspeople from Gijón
Spanish male tennis players
Tennis players from Barcelona
Living people
1991 births
Real Grupo de Cultura Covadonga sportsmen
Tennis players from Asturias
Olympic tennis players of Spain
Tennis players at the 2020 Summer Olympics
Olympic medalists in tennis
Olympic bronze medalists for Spain
Medalists at the 2020 Summer Olympics
21st-century Spanish people